Air Vice-Marshal M. D. A. Prasanna Payoe (also known as AVM Prasantha Payoe) is a retired Air officer of the Sri Lanka Air Force who served as Chief of Staff of the Sri Lanka Air Force. Prior to this appointment, he served as Director Training and the Director Air Operations. He also served as Base Commander of Sri Lanka’s largest air force base, Katunayake.

Early life and education 
Payoe completed his education at S. Thomas' College, Bandarawela. Then he join Sri Lankan Air Force in 1985 at General Duties Pilot Branch. He is a graduate of Defence Services Command and Staff College Sapugaskanda, Sri Lanka and completed NDC from the National Defence University, Pakistan.

Air Force career 
He also served as Defence Attaché to the Russia Federation. After being promoted to AVM he became Director General of the Centre for Defence Research. He retired from active service on 12 September, 2022 while serving as Chief of Staff of the SLAF.

References 

Sri Lanka Air Force air vice-marshals
Living people
Sri Lanka Air Force Academy graduates
Sinhalese military personnel
1967 births